The 1930 United States Senate election in Kentucky took place on November 4, 1930, alongside a special election to the same seat.

Incumbent Senator Frederic M. Sackett resigned on January 9, 1930, to become Ambassador to Germany. Governor Flem D. Sampson appointed U.S. Representative John M. Robsion to fill Sackett's seat until a successor could be duly elected. Robsion lost both the special election to complete the term and the regularly scheduled 1930 election, both held on November 4.

General election

Regular election

Candidates
M. M. Logan, Justice of the Kentucky Court of Appeals and former Kentucky Attorney General (Democratic)
John M. Robsion, interim Senator and former U.S. Representative from Barbourville (Republican)

Results

Special election

Candidates

Ben M. Williamson, president of the Kentucky Crippled Children's Commission (Democratic)
John M. Robsion, interim Senator and former U.S. Representative from Barbourville (Republican)

Results

See also
1930 United States Senate elections

Notes

References 

1930
Kentucky
United States Senate
Kentucky 1930
Kentucky 1930
United States Senate 1930